is a Japanese voice actor who works for Ken Production. He has a sister, Sayaka Ōhara, who is also a voice actress.

Filmography

Television animation
2004
Sgt. Frog – Students
Bleach – Taishi Sakura 
2005
Emma: A Victorian Romance – Delivery man (ep 1)
Kamichu! – Cat A (DVD ep 8), Agent (DVD ep 4), Hero (In Movie) (DVD ep 11), Leaf Spirit (DVD ep 1), Cat Sprite (DVD ep 2), Stundent Council President (DVD ep 10), /Noodle God (DVD ep 7)
Cluster Edge – Cluster students)
Angel Heart – Host
Kotenkotenko – Vernon, White Rat
2006
Gakuen Heaven – Nagahara, Student 1 (eps 8-10), Student B (ep 2), Swimming Club Captain (ep 3), Upperclassman 1 (handicrafts club; ep 13), Waiter (ep 7)
Higurashi When They Cry – Delinquent 2 (eps 5, 16, 18)
NANA – Convenience store clerk / Photographers
The Story of Saiunkoku – Courtier (ep 8)
Fairy Musketeers – Villager
La Corda D'Oro - primo passo – Kaoru Morimiya
009-1 – Rider (ep 9)
Happiness! – Yuuma Kohinata
Ghost Slayers Ayashi – Kozuki
Kekkaishi – Ishirou (ep 50), Tomonori Ichigaya
2007
Nodame Cantabile – Male Student A (ep 5), Ryuuji Tsuboi (eps 20-21)
Reideen – Crew
Engage Planet Kiss Dum – Abd
Over Drive – Player
Bokurano – Kenji (eps 1-2)
Kaze no Stigma – Furyou
The Skull Man – Vigilant (ep 3)
Devil May Cry – Customer A (ep 1), Treasure Hunter (ep 6)
Mushi-Uta – Clerk
Sky Girls – Aviation Festival Announcement
Potemayo – Schoolboy, Geography Teacher
Sketchbook ~full color'S~ – Raika Kamiya
Neuro - Supernatural Detective – Entourage, Police
You're Under Arrest: Full Throttle – Motorcycle police personnel
Mobile Suit Gundam 00 – Ming (ep 10)
Kimikiss pure rouge – Chauffeur (ep 12), Soccer Club Advisor (6 episodes), Soccer Club Member (ep 4)
Hatarakids My Ham Gumi – Alan
Genshiken 2 – Sai Bouzu (ep 1)
2008
Clannad – Other school student (ep 17)
Shugo Chara! – Higeshiro's Apprentice (ep 46)
Minami-ke: Okawari – Haru's Replacement (ep 12), Haruka's homeroom teacher (ep 2), Teacher A (ep 9)
Aria the Origination – Husband (ep 11)
Noramimi – Character Post Staff (eps 9-10)
Allison & Lillia – Engineer (ep 16) Pilot (ep 17)
Macross Frontier – Henry Gilliam (ep 1)
Blassreiter – Philip (eps 3, 5, 7-8)
Nabari no Ou – Classmate (ep 2), Teacher (ep 15)
Psychic Squad – Brigade Member (ep 3), Group Member
Monochrome Factor – Band member (ep 1)
Uchi no 3 Shimai – Doctor
Kyōran Kazoku Nikki – Priest (ep 1), Subordinate C (ep 10), Suzuki (ep 4), White ape (ep 5)
Sekirei – Covert Op B (ep 1)
Birdy the Mighty: Decode – Masakubo
Nogizaka Haruka no Himitsu – Mech-san (ep 4)
Toradora! – boy (eps 4, 12), Murase (student council; ep 16), schoolboy (eps 2, 21), student council member (ep 11)
Legends of the Dark King: A Fist of the North Star Story – Club (ep 8), Riga (ep 10)
Tales of the Abyss – York (ep 7)
Kemeko Deluxe! – Researcher
Kannagi: Crazy Shrine Maidens – Male customer (ep 6), Male student (eps 3, 5), Prank call (ep 11)
Magician's Academy – Mikhail
Tytania – Alan Mahdi
Nodame Cantabile: Paris – Examiner (ep 1)
2009
Battle Spirits: Shōnen Toppa Bashin – Guard B (ep 37), Track Team Member A (ep 30)
Samurai Harem – Male student, Twink, Assassin, Butler
Birdy the Mighty Decode:02 – Masakubo
Phantom: Requiem for the Phantom – Students
Pandora Hearts – Grim
Basquash! – Audience (ep 4), FFF (eps 5, 7), Man C (ep 3), Opponent A (ep 11), Reporter (ep 9), Salesman (ep 6), Surveying engineer (ep 14)
Polyphonica Crimson S – Students
Guin Saga – Eku (ep 8), Mongauli Soldier (ep 10)
Fullmetal Alchemist: Brotherhood – Knox's Son (ep 31)
Hatsukoi Limited – Teacher, staff swimming, tennis club manager
CANAAN – Secret Service B (ep 6)
Tokyo Magnitude 8.0 – Hyper rescue team, emergency personnel
Modern Magic Made Simple – Shop manager (ep 1)
Battle Spirits: Shōnen Gekiha Dan – Bodyguard 2 (ep 10), Chairman (ep 14)
Queen's Blade 2: The Evil Eye – Customer A (ep 6), Elf (ep 4)
A Certain Scientific Railgun – Anti-Skill (ep 17), Bank robbery (ep 1), Hoodlum A (ep 14), Okahara Ryouta (ep 12), Teacher (eps 7-8)
Yumeiro Pâtissière – French language teacher (ep 17), Satō (15 episodes), Shigeru Amano (6 episodes)
Nogizaka Haruka no Himitsu: Purezza – Manager (ep 10)
2010
Shugo Chara!! Doki— – Shūsui Sōma (ep 79)
Chu-Bra!! – Student
Heartcatch Precure! – Theater club member (ep 16)
Maid Sama! – Customer (ep 4), Guy B (ep 5), Shop attendant (ep 11), Takashi Ogimoto (eps 3, 12), Takezawa (ep 1)
Ichiban Ushiro no Dai Mao – Young man (ep 4)
Mayoi Neko Overrun! – Youth group
Uragiri wa Boku no Namae o Shitteiru – Jekyll (eps 7-8, 10-13)
The Tatami Galaxy – Man B (ep 1)
Battle Spirits: Brave – Ed (ep 11)
Yumeiro Pâtissière SP Professional – Satou
2011
Bakugan Battle Brawlers: Gundalian Invaders – Child (ep 4), Ethan/Jesse
Inazuma Eleven GO – Tsurugi Kyousuke 
Chihayafuru – Akito Sudō
2012
Natsuiro Kiseki – Fujii
Inazuma Eleven GO 2: Chrono Stone – Kuosu, Tsurugi Kyousuke
Natsuyuki Rendezvous – Deliveryman (ep 2)
2013
Chihayafuru 2 – Akito Sudō
2014
Buddy Complex – Ryutaro Imajo
Gundam Build Fighters Try – Shunsuke Sudou
The Irregular at Magic High School - Shun Morisaki

Original video animation (OVA)
Birdy the Mighty Decode: The Cipher (2009) – Masakubo
TO Daen Kidou (2009) – Tokio

Films
Macross Frontier: Itsuwari no Utahime (2009) – Henry Gilliam
Magical Girl Lyrical Nanoha The MOVIE 1st (2010) – Armed bureau staff B
Macross Frontier: Sayonara no Tsubasa (2011) – Henry Gilliam
Inazuma Eleven GO vs. Danbōru Senki W (2012) – Tsurugi Kyousuke

Tokusatsu
Kamen Rider Drive (2015) – Bat-Type Roidmude 007/Sword Roidmude (Chest core) (ep 25, 26)

Video games
The Sniper 2 (2002) – Stanley Jones
Angel's Feather (2004) – Yousuke Tsuji
Samurai Shodown V Special (2004) – Shiro Tokisada Amakusa
Mystereet ~Yasogami Kaoru no Chousen!~ (2006) – Escort Man, Minoru Fujimichi, Danshaku Kazatsumari, Driver
EVE ～new generation～ (2006) – Yoshi
Luminous Arc (2007) – Kai
Class of Heroes (2008) – Male Fairy
Mobile Suit Gundam 00 Gundam Meisters (2008) – General Soldier B
Arc Rise Fantasia (2009) – Mark
Souten no Kanata (2009) – Le Fang
Phantasy Star Portable 2 (2009) – Inheruto company employees
Macross Triangle Frontier (2011) – A# Hero
Ni no Kuni (2011) – Rodekku
Star Fox 64 3D (2011) – Fox McCloud, Leon Powalski
The Legend of Zelda: Skyward Sword (2011) – Link
Generation of Chaos 6 (2012) – Ryan / Reryi Lara
Inazuma Eleven GO 3: Galaxy (2014) – Tsurugi Kyousuke
Dynasty Warriors 8: Empires (2014) – Xun Yu
Mario Kart 8 (2014) – Link
The King of Fighters XIV (2016) – Shun'ei
Final Fantasy XV (2016) – Loqi Tummelt
Snack World: The Dungeon Crawl – Gold (2018) – Vinsant, Avatar (Male)
Dynasty Warriors 9 – Xun Yu
Super Smash Bros. Ultimate (2018) - Fox McCloud, Mii Fighter Type 3
Warriors Orochi 4 – Xun Yu (also in Ultimate)
Starlink: Battle for Atlas (2019) – Fox McCloud, Leon Powalski
The King of Fighters XV (2022) – Shun'ei

Dubbing
Fanboys, Windows (Jay Baruchel)
The Jane Austen Book Club, Trey (Kevin Zegers)
The Resident, Devon Pravesh (Manish Dayal)

References

External links
  Kenproduction - Takashi Ōhara
 

Japanese male video game actors
Japanese male voice actors
1978 births
Male voice actors from Yokohama
Living people
21st-century Japanese male actors
Ken Production voice actors